Francisco Carlos Bustillo Bonasso (born April 1, 1960) is a Uruguayan diplomat, serving as Minister of Foreign Relations of Uruguay since July 6, 2020.

Bustillo entered the Ministry of Foreign Affairs of Uruguay by merit competition on January 1, 1986. He has held several positions in Montevideo and abroad, such as the Director of Institutional Affairs and Bilateral Economic Affairs of the Ministry. He was also named Ambassador of Uruguay to Spain in October, 2012.

Career

Diplomatic positions 
On April 1, 2005, he was appointed by President Tabaré Vázquez as Ambassador Extraordinary and Plenipotentiary of Uruguay in Argentine Republic, a position he held for 5 years. In 2010, President José Mujica replaced him with Guillermo Pomi. And on October 2, 2012, he appointed Bustillo as Ambassador of Uruguay to Spain.

Political positions 

In late June 2020, it was confirmed that Bustillo would replace Ernesto Talvi as Minister of Foreign Relations of Uruguay, who presented his resignation, stating "It has been a privilege to serve the citizens of Uruguay from the Foreign Ministry at this time in which it was necessary to face extremely complex challenges". Finally, on July 1, it was confirmed that Bustillo would take office on Monday, July 6. The Deputy Minister of Foreign Affairs is Carolina Ache Batlle.

In September 2020,  UN Watch exposed Uruguay’s vote for a UN resolution that singled out Israel alone in the world for supposedly violating women’s rights. Uruguay’s Foreign Minister Francisco Bustillo declared that his country’s UN vote against Israel was a “circumstantial error,” and removed the foreign ministry’s director-general of political affairs, Ambassador Pablo Sader, and that Uruguay’s “foreign policy will keep its historical stance to defend the rights of Israel.”

References

1960 births
Living people
Uruguayan diplomats
Ambassadors of Uruguay to Ecuador
Ambassadors of Uruguay to Argentina
Ambassadors of Uruguay to Spain
Recipients of the Order of the Liberator General San Martin
Foreign ministers of Uruguay
Knights Grand Cross of the Order of Isabella the Catholic